The Germany cricket team toured the Netherlands in May 2019 to play two Twenty20 International (T20I) matches against Italy. These were the first T20I fixtures to be played by Italy, after the International Cricket Council announced that all matches played between Associate Members after 1 January 2019 would have full T20I status. Germany had played their first official T20I matches earlier in the month against Belgium. Both matches were played on 25 May 2019, with the teams using the fixtures as part of their preparation for the European Regional Qualifying Finals tournament for the 2019 ICC T20 World Cup Qualifier. Both teams played a 20-over warm up match against a Netherlands Development XI side on 24 May 2019. Italy won the T20I series 2–0.

Squads

Tour matches

1st T20 match: Netherlands Development XI vs Italy

2nd T20 match: Netherlands Development XI vs Germany

T20I series

1st T20I

2nd T20I

Notes

References

External links
 Series home at ESPN Cricinfo

Cricket in Germany
Cricket in Italy
Associate international cricket competitions in 2019